Cori Thomas is an author and screenwriter of Liberian and Brazilian descent. Cori is co-writer of Sara Kruzan's memoir I Cried to Dream Again, published in May 2022 by Penguin Random House. She is also an award winning playwright whose works include When January Feels Like Summer, Lockdown, My Secret Language of Wishes, Pa's Hat, “Citizens Market” and more.

Early life
Thomas is the daughter of a Liberian ambassador.

Career
The world premiere of Thomas's When January Feels Like Summer was directed by Chuck Patterson, her late husband, at the City Theatre In Pittsburgh in 2010 and won the American Theatre Critics Association Elizabeth Osborn New Play Award for an emerging playwright. It was subsequently co-produced by the Ensemble Studio Theatre and Page73 Productions in the Summer of 2014 in New York and directed by Daniella Topol. It was a Critics Pick of The New York Times and was brought back in October 2014 as a co-production between the Ensemble Studio Theatre and the Women's Project Theater also directed by Daniella Topol.

Other plays include Pa's Hat, which premiered at the Pillsbury House Theatre in Minnesota in 2010, directed by Marion McClinton; and My Secret Language of Wishes, which premiered at the Mixed Blood Theatre in 2011, also directed by McClinton.

In May, 2019 Lockdown directed by Kent Gash was produced at Rattlestick Theater in NY. https://www.nytimes.com/2019/05/09/theater/lockdown-review.html?smid=nytcore-ios-share

Cori is the Andrew Mellon Playwright-In-Residence at WP Theater in NYC. She is also a current New Dramatists Fellow. 

Cori Thomas is one of five playwrights to win the prestigious Helen Merrill Playwriting award.https://www.broadwayworld.com/industry/article/Five-Playwrights-Receive-Prestigious-Helen-Merrill-Awards-20220908

Her fellowships and residencies include the Sundance Theatre Lab in 2008. O’Neill National Playwright’s Conference in 2018. And many other fellowships and residencies.

References

External links
 Cori Thomas at Clyde Fitch Report* https://www.nytimes.com/2014/06/10/theater/when-january-feels-like-summer-at-ensemble-studio-theater.html?_r=0
 http://www.post-gazette.com/ae/theater-dance/2010/04/01/Subway-is-a-platform-for-humanity-in-January-Feels-Like-Summer/stories/201004010361
 Cori Thomas at Dramatic Publishing Co.
 Cori Thomas at Italian & American Playwrights Project
 https://variety.com/2017/biz/news/dustin-hoffman-2-1202641525/

Living people
American dramatists and playwrights
Marymount Manhattan College alumni
American people of Liberian descent
American people of Brazilian descent
Year of birth missing (living people)